Edward Józef Abramowski (17 August 1868 – 21 June 1918) was a Polish philosopher, libertarian socialist, anarchist, psychologist, ethician, and supporter of cooperatives. Abramowski is also one of the best known activists of classical anarchism in Poland.

Biography
Abramowski was born on 17 August 1868 in Stefanin, in the Vasilkovsky Uyezd of Kiev Governorate (present-day Ukraine) to Jadwiga and Edward. After his mother died (in 1878), he moved to Warsaw in 1879, where his teacher, Maria Konopnicka, introduced him to the members of the First Proletariat. In 1892 he took part in the Paris gathering of Polish socialists, where Polish Socialist Party was founded.

Abramowski is considered the founder of the Polish co-operative movement, promoting economic associations and initiatives. As a supporter of the cooperative movement, he founded a cooperative magazine "Społem" (Together) in 1906.

In 1915 he was given a chair in Experimental Psychology at the University of Warsaw, which he occupied until his death.

He died on  21 June 1918 in Warsaw.

Thought 
Influenced by Leo Tolstoy, Abramowski called himself a "state-rejecting socialist" in his most important work, Socialism & State. He went on to further his political philosophy in other works, such as The Republic of Friends, and General Collusion Against the Government. In later years, his thought increasingly tended towards anarcho-syndicalism, emphasising the importance of co-operative organization of the work force.

Alongside this politico-social theorising, he also conducted an intense research activity in the field of experimental psychology, showing particular interest in the subconscious.

Works
 Zagadnienia socjalizmu, Lviv 1899 (pod pseud.: Z.R. Walczewski)
 Etyka a rewolucja, 1899
 Socjalizm a państwo. Przyczynek do krytyki współczesnego socjalizmu, Lviv 1904
 Zmowa powszechna przeciw rządowi, Cracow 1905
 Idee społeczne kooperatyzmu 1907
 Le subconscient normal 1914
 Pisma, t. I-IV, Warszawa 1924–1928
 Filozofia społeczna. Wybór pism, Warsaw 1968
 Metafizyka doświadczalna i inne pisma, Warsaw 1980

See also

 Anarchism in Poland
 History of philosophy in Poland
 List of Poles

External links

Abramowski biography

References

1868 births
1918 deaths
Anarcho-syndicalists
Polish cooperative organizers
Left-libertarians
Libertarian socialists
People from Vasilkovsky Uyezd
Polish anarchists
Polish libertarians
Polish psychologists
Polish Socialist Party politicians
19th-century Polish philosophers